The Musée gruérien is a museum dedicated to the  ethnography and history of the Gruyère District of the Canton of Fribourg, Switzerland. It is located in Bulle.

Its collection of over 25,000 objects includes prints, drawings, paintings, sculpture, textiles, tools, woodwork, ceramics, furniture, photographs, and so on.

The museum opened in 1917.

References

External links
 Official site (English)

Museums in the canton of Fribourg
History museums in Switzerland